is a game designer for Sonic Team, whose works include Samba de Amigo, Billy Hatcher and the Giant Egg and Sonic the Hedgehog.

Works

References

Living people
Sega people
Video game designers
1972 births